This is a list of tambons (sub-districts) in Thailand, beginning with the letter B. This information may change due to border changes or reorganization.

See also
Organization of the government of Thailand
List of districts of Thailand
List of districts of Bangkok
List of tambon in Thailand
Provinces of Thailand
List of municipalities in Thailand

 B